Dramay Baziyan is a 2014 sitcom that airs on Hum TV. It is directed by Danish Nawaz, written by Farhad Qaim Khani and produced by  Minhail Productions. It was nominated as Best Sitcom at 3rd Hum Awards but lost to Uff Meri Family.

Cast

 Danish Nawaz
 Uroosa Siddiqui
 Noman Habib

References

External links 
 official website
 

2014 Pakistani television series debuts
Urdu-language television shows
Pakistani television sitcoms
Hum TV original programming
2014 Pakistani television series endings